Gold Coast Lounge is a 2020 Ghanaian neo-noir film written and directed by Pascal Aka, who also stars in the film. Other featured actors includes, Alphonse Menyo, Adjetey Anang, Zynnell Zuh, Raquel.

Synopsis
The Gold Coast Lounge, ran by John Donkor’s crime syndicate, is a popular haunt for the criminal element of colonial Ghana. with the independence of the country looming, the Lounge is threatened with closure by the new government. In this time, Donkor himself is in prison, with the lounge being managed by Donkor’s lieutenants, Daniel and Wisdom.

Both taken in from a young age by Donkor, Daniel and Wisdom soon developed a fierce rivalry that continues to this day. The rivalry only intensified as Donkor considers Daniel his heir apparent, alienating Wisdom further.

After their leader is killed, the eldest must take over, then comes insurrection and criminal investigation.

Cast  
 Alphonse Menyo as Daniel
 Pascal Aka as Wisdom
 Raquel Ammah as Rose
 Fred Nii Amugi as Inspector Adwene Mu Ti
 Adjetey Anang as John Donkor
 Akofa Edjeani Asiedu as Auntie Adjoa
 Gideon Boakye
 Cina Soul
 Zynnell Zuh as Akatua

Awards 
In 2019, the movie won eight awards in the Ghana Movie Award and also won six awards at the Golden Movie Awards in 2020.

References

External links

Ghanaian drama films
2020 films
2020s English-language films
English-language Ghanaian films